Jessie Knight may refer to:

Jessie Knight (tattoo artist)
Jessie Knight (athlete)